The Cottrell House is a historic house in South Kingstown, Rhode Island.  The house is the centerpiece of a working farm complex which includes  of land, and is one of South Kingstown's last working farms.  The house, built c. 1790, is a fairly typical Federal style structure,  stories tall, five bays wide, with a large central chimney.  The main barn, located south of the house, is believed to be contemporary to the house, although it has undergone some alteration and extension in the 20th century.

The property was listed on the National Register of Historic Places in 1996.

See also
National Register of Historic Places listings in Washington County, Rhode Island

References

Houses in South Kingstown, Rhode Island
Houses completed in 1790
Houses on the National Register of Historic Places in Rhode Island
National Register of Historic Places in Washington County, Rhode Island
Federal architecture in Rhode Island